Cyperus laevigatus is a species of sedge known by the common name smooth flatsedge.

Distribution
Cyperus laevigatus is grows in wet areas, especially in brackish water, wet alkaline soils, mineral-rich hot springs, and other moist saline and alkaline habitat. It is known from the beaches of the Hawaiian Islands and salty pools in the deserts of the Southwestern United States (California, Arizona, Texas) down through Mexico and Central America to South America. It is also widespread across most of the West Indies, Africa, the Mediterranean Basin, the Middle East, India, Central Asia, Australia and various oceanic islands.

Description
Cyperus laevigatusis a perennial sedge growing up to 60 centimeters tall, sometimes in clumps interconnected on a horizontal rhizome. The inflorescence is a small array of cylindrical spikelets with one to three leaflike bracts at the base. The spikelets vary in color from green to reddish to dark brown.

History
In Hawai'i, Cyperus laevigatus is known as makaloa and was used by the people of Ni'ihau to make beautiful plaited mats.  Many of the finest examples of plaiting in Hawai'i are made from makaloa.

Ecology
The caterpillars of the tiny moth Chedra microstigma have been found to mine within the leaves of this host plant in coastal marsh in Oahu.

See also
List of Cyperus species

References

External links

Jepson Manual Treatment - Cyperus laevigatus
USDA Plants Profile: Cyperus laevigatus
Cyperus laevigatus - U.C. Photo gallery

laevigatus
Brackish water plants
Salt marsh plants
Flora of North America
Flora of Hawaii
Flora of the Caribbean
Flora of Asia
Flora of Australia
Flora of Madagascar
Flora of Central America
Flora of South America
Plants described in 1767